The Kugelhandgranate ('ball hand grenade') is a model of hand thrown fragmentation grenade manufactured in Germany, also known as Mod. 1913.

M1915 Kugelhandgranate NA
By 1915, German industry was preparing for a long war and resources were already becoming stretched, making it beneficial from both an economic and manufacturing point of view to design a replacement for the Kugelhandgranate Mod. 1913. The Kugelhandgranate Mod. 1915 (which was considerably easier to produce) was thus introduced and used from 1915 onward.

Description

The body of the grenade was cast iron 8 mm thick, spherical shaped and externally segmented designed  to produce between 70 and 80 fragments. A bronze-like stick (which was the igniter) was introduced to the spherical body. The filling was a mixture of black powder, barium nitrate, and potassium perchlorate, and did not require a detonator. The friction igniter consisted of a bronze body with a central chamber filled with black powder and supplied with a 5 or 7 second delay, the powder train was topped with a priming wire made of brass with a loop at one end and serrated on the other. The serrated portion was coated with a mixture of ground glass, manganese dioxide, and potassium chlorate.

Method of use

To be used, the friction wire had to be pulled from the igniter, starting the delay train at the last possible moment. To do this, a piece of leather was attached to the igniter with a snap hook; pulling this removed the wire so the grenade could be thrown. A man with average strength could throw this grenade about 15 m.

See also 
 Mills bomb
 F1 grenade (France)

References
 
 http://www.inert-ord.net/gerimp/kugels/
 Images and description of Kugelhandgranate 1913 and other grenades

1913 establishments in Germany
1920s disestablishments in Germany
Fragmentation grenades
Hand grenades of Germany
World War I German infantry weapons